The Motorola C385 is a low-cost 900/1800/1900-band GSM mobile phone, manufactured by Motorola. It was released in the first quarter of 2004 . Dimensions are 107 x 44 x 20.9 mm, weight is 80 g. It was available in Cosmic Universe Blue and Shadow Anthracite.

Main Features 
 Downloadable wallpaper, screensaver and ringtones
 MMS and SMS
 WAP 2.0 and GPRS for Internet access
 1.8 mb internal memory
 CSTN-display with 65.000 colours, 128 x 128 pixels, 5 lines
 phonebook with 500 entries
 GPRS (Class 10 - 32-48 kbit/s)
 USB
 iTap

C385
Mobile phones introduced in 2004